Reginald Goodridge (born 11 November, 1952) is a Liberian politician and former government minister. Goodridge was born in Liberia in 1952. He was a member of Charles Taylor's National Patriotic party and served as a press secretary to Taylor following his election as Liberian president. He also served as Liberian minister for Culture, Information, Tourism of Liberia. Following the end of the Second Liberian Civil War, Goodridge argued that there would be "bloodbath" in the country if Taylor was forced to resign. In 2005, Goodridge left the National Patriotic Party and joined the new version of the True Whig Party (TWP). He was appointed as the TWP's chairman in 2015. In 2021, Goodridge led a campaign for the reburial and an official memorial service, for TWP government officials who were killed during the 1980 Liberian coup d'état.

References

1952 births
Living people
20th-century Liberian politicians
21st-century Liberian politicians